Ulrich Deppendorf (born 27 January 1950) is a German journalist and television presenter.

Life 
Deppendorf was the host of the German news show Bericht aus Berlin on German broadcaster ARD.

External links 
 
  television host website by ARD
 podcast archiv „Deppendorfs Woche“
 „Der Bassist“, article about Ulrich Deppendorf, Georg Löwisch, 19 November 2011, die tageszeitung

German male journalists
Mass media people from North Rhine-Westphalia
German television presenters
German television reporters and correspondents
German broadcast news analysts
20th-century German journalists
21st-century German journalists
People from Essen
1950 births
Living people
German male writers
ARD (broadcaster) people
Westdeutscher Rundfunk people